Cédric Amissi (born 2 July 1990) is a Burundian footballer who plays for Al-Qadsiah in the Saudi Arabian league. He played for Burundi internationals in the 2014 and 2018 FIFA World Cup qualifiers.

International career

International goals
Scores and results list Burundi's goal tally first.

Honours
Al-Taawoun FC
 Kings Cup (Saudi Arabia): 2019

References

External links
 

1990 births
Living people
Association football forwards
Burundian footballers
Burundi international footballers
Expatriate footballers in Mozambique
Burundian expatriate sportspeople in Mozambique
Burundian expatriate footballers
Expatriate footballers in Portugal
Rayon Sports F.C. players
FC Chibuto players
C.F. União players
Al-Taawoun FC players
Al-Qadsiah FC players
Liga Portugal 2 players
Saudi Professional League players
Saudi First Division League players
Expatriate footballers in Saudi Arabia
Burundian expatriate sportspeople in Portugal
Burundian expatriate sportspeople in Saudi Arabia
Sportspeople from Bujumbura
2019 Africa Cup of Nations players
Prince Louis FC players
Burundian expatriate sportspeople in Rwanda
Expatriate footballers in Rwanda